App is a surname. Notable people with the surname include:

Austin App (1902–1984), German-American academic and Holocaust denier
Timothy App (born 1948), American painter
Urs App (born 1949), Swiss academic

See also
Apps (surname)